Indian Summer is an electronic music project of Australian record producer, DJ, songwriter, and radio personality Gabe Gleeson; it was previously a duo with Chevy Long. He has performed at Splendour In The Grass, Field Day, Falls Festival, and Beyond The Valley.

As of 2020, he also releases music under the pseudonym Gabe Ruth through Medium Rare Recordings. His 2022 single 'Make Your Move' was added to rotation on Triple J Unearthed Radio.

Biography

2012 saw Indian Summer signed to Australian electronic label Sweat It Out! Music! Music by its late founder DJ Ajax, they embarked on their first Australian tour and were listed among FBi Radio's most played artists the following year. In 2014 they were invited to perform at SXSW, toured the United States, were named as one of MTV Australia's top producers of the year and mixed Sweat It Out! Music’s ‘Let’s Sweat’ compilation album released by Universal Music Australia. Indian Summer again toured domestically as part of 'Nina Las Vegas Presents' alongside TKAY Maidza, Cosmo's Midnight, Motez, Touch Sensitive and L D R U as well as for Sweat It Out! Music's 2015 Tour with Dom Dolla, Cassian and Go Freek.

'Shiner' ft. Ginger & The Ghost reached #1 on the Hype Machine chart; its recording and film clip were respectively added to rotation on triple j, Foxtel's Channel V and along with 'Loveweights' ft. Shaqdi, The ABC's Rage program. The act has been the subject of multiple features on triple j including two hour long Mix Up segments and its works have attracted unofficial video remixes from fans.

Gleeson is the grandson of Italian/Australian filmmaker Giorgio Mangiamele. He performed in bands throughout high school and studied design at university before leaving to focus on the project. He was the editor of influential Australian electronic music website Purple Sneakers between 2012 and 2015, hosted its corresponding two hour weekly radio program and has spoken on industry panels at EMC and BigSound.

Discography

Albums and EPs

Singles

Remix EPs

Remixes

Compilations

Music videos

Gabe Ruth

Singles

Remixes

References

External links 

Indian Summer at BBC Music
 
 

Australian DJs
Australian record producers
21st-century Australian musicians
Musicians from Melbourne
DJs from Melbourne
Australian electronic musicians
Australian musicians
Australian house musicians
Living people
1990 births